Umu Oma is a village in southeastern Nigeria near the city of Owerri.

Towns in Imo State
Villages in Igboland